Boris Alexejewitsch Kuryschkin (born 21 June 1989 in Dmitrovsky District, Moscow) is a Russian luger who has competed since 1999. He finished 26th in the men's doubles competition in the 2007-08 World Cup.

References

External links
 

1989 births
Living people
Russian male lugers
People from Dmitrovsky District, Moscow Oblast
Sportspeople from Moscow Oblast